Warsaw Historic District may refer to:

Warsaw Historic District (Warsaw, Illinois), listed on the NRHP in Illinois
Warsaw Courthouse Square Historic District, Warsaw, IN, listed on the NRHP in Indiana
Warsaw Historic District (Warsaw, Kentucky), listed on the NRHP in Kentucky
Warsaw Historic District (Warsaw, North Carolina), listed on the NRHP in North Carolina